V. M. Girija (born 27 July 1961) is an Indian poet and essayist, writing in Malayalam language. She has published a number of books, which include Prem - Ek Album, the Hindi translation of her poetry anthology in Malayalam, Pranayam Oralbum. Kerala Sahithya Akademi awarded her their 2018 annual award for poetry and she is a recipient of 'Changmpuzha Award for literature' and the 'Basheer Amma Malayalam Puraskaram'.

Biography 
V. M. Girija was born on July 27, 1961, to Vadakkeppattu Vasudevan Bhattathirippad and Gauri, at Paruthipra, a village near Shornur in Palakkad district in the south Indian state of Kerala. Her college education was at the Sanskrit College, Pattambi from where she earned a master's degree in Malayalam, standing first in the examination. She started writing at an early age and her early poems were published in Balapankthi of Mathrubhumi. She started her career in 1983 by joining All India Radio as an announcer and moved to Kochi FM Station when it was started in 1989. She retired from Kochi FM in 2021 after 38 years of service.

Girija has published ten books of which Pranayam Oralbum has been translated into Hindi by A. Aravindakshan, under the title, Prem-Ek Album. The other books are Jeevajalam (Current Books, 2004), Paavayunu (Sign Books, 2007), Pennugal Kanatha Pathira Neragal (Mathrubhumi Books, 2011), Oridathoridathoridathu (Current Books, 2012), Poochayurakkam (KSCIL, 2014), Kadaloraveedu (Logos Books, 2015), Paavayoonu (Illustrated Version-Kerala Sasthra Sahithya Parishad, 2015), Irupakshampeduminduvalla Njan, Moonu Deerkha Kavithakal(DC Books, 2017) and The Black Stone, a translation of her poems into English by P. P. Raveendran. She has also edited book, Ellaarudeyum bhoomi, a compilation of poems of Savithri Antharjanam. She has received the Changampuzha Award for literature and one of her books is a prescribed academic text for graduate course in Malayalam at the University of Calicut.

Girija is married to C. R. Neelakandan, a noted environmental activist. The couple has two daughters, Aardra and Aarcha and the family lives in Kakkanadu in Kochi.

Awards and honours 
Girija received the 2018 Kerala Sahitya Akademi Award for Poetry for her anthology, Budha Purnima. She has also received the 'Changmpuzha Award for literature' and the 'Basheer Amma Malayalam Puraskaram'.

Bibliography 

 Pranayam Oralbum (1997)
 Prem-Ek Album (1999)
 Jeevajalam (2004)
 Paavayunu (2007)
 Pennugal Kanatha Pathira Neragal (2011)
 Oridathoridathoridathu (2012)
 Poochayurakkam (2014)
 Kadaloraveedu (2015)
 Paavayoonu (Illustrated Version, 2015)
 Irupakshampeduminduvalla Njan (2015)
 Moonu Deerkha Kavithakal(2017)

See also 
 List of Malayalam-language authors by category
 List of Malayalam-language authors

References

External links 
 
 
 

1961 births
Living people
Women writers from Kerala
21st-century Indian women writers
21st-century Indian poets
Writers from Palakkad
Poets from Kerala
20th-century Indian poets
20th-century Indian women
20th-century Indian people